Pectate trisaccharide-lyase (exopectate-lyase, pectate lyase A, PelA) is an enzyme with systematic name (1→4)-α-D-galacturonan reducing-end-trisaccharide-lyase. This enzyme catalyses the following chemical reaction:

 eliminative cleavage of unsaturated trigalacturonate as the major product from the reducing end of polygalacturonic acid/pectate

The predominant action of this enzyme is removal of a trisaccharide.

References

External links 
 

EC 4.2.2